The Women's 10 metre platform competition at the 1973 World Aquatics Championships was held on 6 and 7 September 1973.

Results
Green denotes finalists

References
Official Results 

Women's 10 metre platform